Jordan–Malaysia relations refers to bilateral foreign relations between the two countries, Jordan and Malaysia. Jordan has an embassy in Kuala Lumpur, and Malaysia has an embassy in Amman. Relations between the two countries are mainly in economic co-operation.

Economic relations 
Currently both countries are working closely especially on the Islamic affairs. In oil project, Malaysia YTL Power has acquired a 30% stake on oil shale project in Jordan. Other Malaysian companies also has started to expand halal food business in Jordan by building a factory and supply the Royal Jordanian Army with halal food. On the other side, Jordan has revive a regular flight service to Malaysia, and the country has invested for a construction of a new international financial district. Jordan also plans to set up a branch of Al al-Bayt University in Malaysia. Both countries has signed an agreement on avoidance of tax. During the Mavi Marmara incident, Jordan also help to bringing any Malaysians detained earlier out of Israel.

Further reading 
 Jordan–Malaysia Relationship and its Influence on the Development of Hadith Studies in Malaysia
 Malaysian ambassador visits JUST, discuss cooperation with its president Jordan News Agency

References 

 
Malaysia
Bilateral relations of Malaysia